Thomas Lamar Woods (December 6, 1933 – April 17, 2020) was an American politician in the state of Mississippi. He served in the Mississippi House of Representatives for 25 years (1988–2012), representing the 52nd district, encompassing parts of DeSoto County and Marshall County initially as a Democrat but later on switched to the Republican. He was Chairman of the Interstate Cooperation committee, as well as a member of the  County Affairs, Public Utilities, Transportation and Ways & Means committees.

Woods, an alumnus of Mississippi State University, was a farmer, cotton ginner and pilot. He was married to Fay Woods, with whom he has five children. He is a member of Sigma Phi Epsilon, the local farm bureau, AOPA, Marshall County Soil & Water Conservation and Northwest Junior College Advisory Board.

He resigned from the House, effective July 30, 2012. He had suffered a stroke in December 2011, which led to his decision to retire.

References

Members of the Mississippi House of Representatives
21st-century American politicians
1933 births
2020 deaths
People from Byhalia, Mississippi